This is the results breakdown of the local elections held in Castile and León on 28 May 1995. The following tables show detailed results in the autonomous community's most populous municipalities, sorted alphabetically.

Overall

City control
The following table lists party control in the most populous municipalities, including provincial capitals (shown in bold). Gains for a party are displayed with the cell's background shaded in that party's colour.

Municipalities

Ávila
Population: 49,639

Burgos
Population: 166,251

León
Population: 147,311

Palencia
Population: 79,561

Ponferrada
Population: 61,505

Salamanca
Population: 167,382

Segovia
Population: 55,372

Soria
Population: 33,317

Valladolid
Population: 336,917

Zamora
Population: 65,885

See also
1995 Castilian-Leonese regional election

References

Castile and León
1995